Anjoman-e Olya (also Romanized as Anjoman-e ‘Olyā) is a village in Chaypareh-ye Pain Rural District, Zanjanrud District, Zanjan County, Zanjan Province, Iran. At the 2006 census, its population was 382, in 66 families.

References 

Populated places in Zanjan County